Kreis Sagan was a Prussian district in Silesia, with its capital at Sagan. It existed until 1932, when it was dissolved and most of its territory was merged into the Sprottau district, with some smaller areas being assigned to other adjacent districts.

Demographics 
According to the Prussian census of 1861, the Sagan district had a population of 53,934, of which 53,913 (99.96%) were Germans and 21 (0.04%) were Sorbs.

References

Districts of Prussia
Province of Silesia
1816 establishments in Prussia
1932 disestablishments in Germany